Dániel Kovács (born 16 January 1994) is a Hungarian professional footballer who plays for Fehérvár FC.

Career statistics

.

References

External links

1994 births
Living people
People from Gyula
Hungarian footballers
Association football goalkeepers
Zalaegerszegi TE players
Csákvári TK players
Soroksár SC players
Fehérvár FC players
Nemzeti Bajnokság I players
Sportspeople from Békés County
21st-century Hungarian people